Kapitonov is a Russian masculine surname, its feminine counterpart is Kapitonova. It may refer to

Dmitry Kapitonov (born 1968), Russian long-distance runner
Natalia Kapitonova (born 2000), Russian artistic gymnast
Viktor Kapitonov (1933–2005), Russian cyclist
Viktorina Kapitonova (born 1985), Russian ballerina
Vladimir Kapitonov, Russian-American biologist and geneticist 

Russian-language surnames